Rama Rao or Ramarao may refer to:

 A. V. Rama Rao, Indian inventor and chemist
 Gokina Rama Rao, Telugu film character artist
 K. S. Rama Rao, Telugu film producer
 K. T. Rama Rao, Indian politician
 M. S. Ramarao, Telugu film singer and composer
 N. T. Rama Rao, Telugu film actor
 N. T. Rama Rao Jr., Telugu film actor
 Palle Rama Rao, Indian scientist
 T. Rama Rao, Indian film maker